"" is a concert video recorded on Ringo Shiina's nationwide "" tour in the summer of 2003. The DVD was released on December 17, 2003, by distributor Toshiba EMI/Virgin Music.

The first pressing of the DVD was available as a special limited edition, entitled "" and included a book attached to the DVD case which included a photographic history of Shiina's life and musical activities over the past five years, as well as bonus video content on the DVD.

Outline

"Electric Mole" is a recording of the final concert of Shiina's nationwide 2003 "" tour, held at the Nippon Budokan. The concert showcases a variety of songs from her debut album "Muzai Moratorium", sophomore album "Shōso Strip", and cover album "Utaite Myōri: Sono Ichi".

Midway through the concert, footage cuts to a different night's performance, skipping the songs "Kōfukuron" and "Ringo no Uta", the debut of the latter, which were played live but did not make it onto the concert DVD. Consequently, some fans expressed disappointment with the way the footage was edited for the DVD.

As background video displayed during the concert shows Shiina's trademark mole disappearing from her left cheek, the DVD's title of "Electric Mole" is assumed to reference to this, and the way she later had the mole surgically removed in the winter of 2003.

Tracklist

Sugoroku Ecstasy 
" " is the third nationwide concert tour by Ringo Shiina.
The tour was in support of her third album Kalk Samen Kuri no Hana, though she performed material from her first two albums extensively, and spanned eight cities in prefectures across Japan, namely Tokyo, Aichi, Hiroshima, Hyougo, Kyoto, Hokkaido, Fukuoka and Okinawa.
Two tour dates each were held in Tokyo and Fukuoka, for a total of ten. The tour initially spanned August 23 to September 21, with the final Budokan concert on September 27 added at the end.

This tour is characterized by a greater inclusion of cover songs than any of her past concerts.

A special limited edition Duesenberg DSR-SR Ringo Shiina model guitar, nicknamed the "" and patterned after Shiina's signature model electric guitar, was produced for sale by "Duesenberg Guitars" to commemorate the fifth anniversary of her debut.

Tour Dates

Backing Band 
This tour marks the formation of the band that would later be known as "", although the members served as Shiina's backing band and were not formally introduced until the conclusion of the tour.

Tour members' names were written out in katakana with the exclusion of the final character. For example, keyboard player H ZHETT M's name was rendered as "ヒイズミ マサユ機" (Hiizumi Masayuki).

 Vocals, Electric bass guitar: シーナ リン湖 Shiina Ringo
 Electric bass guitar: カメダ セー時 Kameda Seiji 
 Electric guitar: ヒラマ ミキ緒 Hirama Mikio
 Piano: ヒーズミ マサユ季 Hiizumi Masayuki
 Drums: ハタ トシ樹 Hata Toshiki

References

External links 
DVD entry at Shiina's official site Kronekodow 
PE'Z official site 
pe'zmoku official site 

Ringo Sheena video albums